Champions Carry On is a 1943 American short documentary film about how American sports figures were contributing to the war effort, produced by Edmund Reek. It was nominated for an Academy Award at the 16th Academy Awards for Best Short Subject (One-Reel).

References

External links
 

1943 films
1943 short films
1943 documentary films
1940s short documentary films
Black-and-white documentary films
American short documentary films
American World War II propaganda shorts
Documentary films about sportspeople
American black-and-white films
20th Century Fox short films
1940s English-language films
1940s American films